Technopolis is a Flemish technology education centre located near Mechelen.

Flanders Technology International
Technopolis is an initiative which grew out of the Flanders Technology International (FTI) Foundation, which was an initiative of the Flemish government. Since 7 October 1999, the FTI offices are located within the premises of the Technopolis centre and the name of the organization was changed to Technopolis. The goal of the organization is to stimulate biotechnology and micro-electronics, and to increase the visibility of science in Flanders.

Exhibition
The Technopolis science museum was founded on 26 February 2000. It has a permanent interactive (hands-on) exhibition for science and technology on display.

See also
 Science and technology in Flanders
 Agoria, technology industry in Belgium.
 Institute for the promotion of Innovation by Science and Technology (IWT)
 Interuniversity Microelectronics Centre (IMEC)
 Deutsches Museum
 Euro Space Center
 Evoluon
 Scienceworks Museum
 Telus Spark

External links
 Technopolis

Science museums
Scientific organisations based in Belgium
Flanders
Mechelen
Buildings and structures in Flemish Brabant